Francesco Corapi (born 22 December 1985) is an Italian professional footballer who plays for Lamezia Terme.

Biography
Born in Catanzaro, Calabria, Corapi started his career at U.S. Catanzaro. He played twice in the last two rounds of 2004–05 Serie B.

In 2005 Corapi left for Serie D club Sapri (Italian fifth division until 2014). In 2006, he was signed by Serie C2 club Gela. In August 2007 he joined fellow fourth division club Vibonese. In January 2008 he left for Benevento.

Catanzaro return
In 2008 Corapi returned to hometown for F.C. Catanzaro in co-ownership deal (which Catanzaro signed him outright from Benevento in June 2009). He spent  seasons in Lega Pro Seconda Divisione (ex- Serie C2) until January 2011, which he was signed by Siracusa of Lega Pro Prima Divisione.

Corapi signed a new 2-year contract worth €37,791.78 in gross annually in August 2010 (decreased from €74,000 in gross in 2009–10 season; €57,000 in gross in 2010–11 season in a contract signed in May 2010, but increased from actual receiving of Lega Pro minimum from 2008 to 3 May 2010 of €16,745 in net and €17,281 in net), the wage was increased to €96,314.72 in gross in the version that submitted to Lega Pro on 3 November 2010. The president of Lega Pro voided the second version of the contract due to financial difficulties of Catanzaro, on 30 November. Catanzaro bankrupted in June 2011.

Vibonese
In 2011 Corapi was re-signed by Vibonese. The club relegated to Serie D (amateur league) after losing the relegation "play-out" to Mantova.

Nocerina
On 14 July 2012 Corapi joined Italian third division club Nocerina. In February 2013 he was suspended 3 months due to contract issue with Catanzaro. His appeal was accepted by the Corte di Giustizia Federale (CGF) of Italian Football Federation (FIGC) on 7 March.

He was the starting midfielder in 4-3-3 formation in the promotion playoffs.

L'Aquila
On 21 August 2013 Corapi joined L'Aquila in 2-year contract.

Trapani
On 16 January 2020, he was released from his contract with Trapani by mutual consent.

Second return to Catanzaro
On 17 January 2020, he returned to Catanzaro once again and signed a 1.5-year contract.

Serie D
On 27 August 2021, he joined Lamezia Terme in Serie D.

Honours
 Serie C2: Benevento (2008)

References

External links
AIC profile (data by football.it) 

Italian footballers
U.S. Catanzaro 1929 players
S.S.D. Città di Gela players
U.S. Vibonese Calcio players
Benevento Calcio players
U.S. Siracusa players
A.S.G. Nocerina players
L'Aquila Calcio 1927 players
Parma Calcio 1913 players
Trapani Calcio players
F.C. Lamezia Terme players
Serie B players
Serie C players
Serie D players
Association football midfielders
People from Catanzaro
1985 births
Living people
Footballers from Calabria
Sportspeople from the Province of Catanzaro